Lindbergh is a hamlet in central Alberta, Canada within the County of St. Paul No. 19. The first settlers of Lindbergh arrived some time in 1906, and by 1911 a ferry, school, and cemetery had been constructed in the area. When the CNR reached nearby Heinsburg in 1927, a post office was moved to Lindbergh from Riverview along with a store. In 1946 oil companies drilling near Lindbergh found salt and began the planning of a new salt plant which was completed in 1948.

Demographics 
Lindbergh recorded a population of 50 in the 1991 Census of Population conducted by Statistics Canada.

See also 
List of communities in Alberta
List of hamlets in Alberta

References 

Hamlets in Alberta
Populated places on the North Saskatchewan River
County of St. Paul No. 19